is a Japanese manga series written and illustrated by the artist Itkz. It has been serialized in the web manga magazine Screamo since 2019, and has been collected into two tankōbon volumes by Suiseisha. The series follows the relationship between Kōichi Mizuki, a human student, and Caius Lao Bistail, a giant prince who summons Kōichi to his world.

The series was adapted into a television anime series by Studio Hōkiboshi and Comet Company in 2020. Episodes stream on the digital distribution platform ComicFesta Anime; versions of each episode that are edited to remove sexually-explicit content broadcast on Tokyo MX, and stream on YouTube and Niconico. English-language translations of both the manga and anime are syndicated by the digital distribution platform Coolmic, which simulcast the anime series during its original broadcast run.

On January 25, 2021, it was announced the anime will receive an anime dub produced by Ascendent Animation.

Synopsis
High school basketball player Kōichi Mizuki is suddenly summoned to a world populated by giants. He is met by Caius Lao Bistail, the prince of the world, who immediately asks Kōichi to marry him.

Characters
 
 
 A high school basketball player who is suddenly summoned to Tildant, a world populated by giants and other mythological creatures.
 
 
 The prince of Tildant, who asks Kōichi to be his bride.
 
 
 Caius's former fiancee.
 
 
 An anthropomorphic wolf and drifter.
 
 
 An anthropomorphic tiger and tradesman.

Media

Manga
The Titan's Bride is written and illustrated by Itkz. It has been serialized as a digital comic by publisher Suieseisha under their Screamo label since 2019, and is published as collected tankōbon volumes under their Glanz BL Comics imprint. An English-language translation of the series is published by the digital distribution platform Coolmic. The series will be receiving a print publication by Seven Seas Entertainment in October 2022. Seven Seas Entertainment boasts that the print edition "will feature the completely uncensored original art not available in other editions."

Anime
On March 18, 2020, The Titan's Bride publisher Suiseisha announced that the series would be adapted into a television anime series. The Titan's Bride stars  as the voice of Kōichi and Yūki Ono as the voice of Caius, who also perform the series' theme song. The first trailer for the series was released on June 19, 2020.

The series  premiered on July 5, 2020. Two versions of each episode are produced: a "premium edition" that airs on the digital distribution platform ComicFesta Anime, which includes sexually-explicit content, and an edited version that airs on Tokyo MX, YouTube, and Niconico which removes sexually-explicit content. In English-language markets, the series is licensed by the digital distribution platform Coolmic.

Other media
An audio drama CD was included with the first tankōbon volume of the manga series, featuring Itō and Ono as Kōichi and Caius, respectively.

A The Titan's Bride web radio series premiered on ComicFesta Radio on July 10, 2020. Episodes were released twice-weekly, and featured interviews with the series' voice cast.

References

External links
 Official website
 

2019 manga
2020 anime television series debuts
2010s LGBT literature
2020s Japanese LGBT-related television series
Anime series based on manga
Isekai anime and manga
Japanese LGBT-related animated television series
LGBT speculative fiction television series
Seven Seas Entertainment titles
Yaoi anime and manga